Orthotylus minutus is a species of bug in the Miridae family that is can be found in Bulgaria, Croatia, Greece, Italy, Moldova, Portugal, Spain, Ukraine, and northwest Russia.

References

Insects described in 1877
Hemiptera of Europe
minutus